Tomáš Kriško (born ) is a Slovak male volleyball player. He is part of the Slovakia men's national volleyball team. On club level he plays for UNTREF Voley.

References

External links
 profile at FIVB.org

1988 births
Living people
Slovak men's volleyball players
Sportspeople from Liptovský Mikuláš
European Games competitors for Slovakia
Volleyball players at the 2015 European Games